Reynolda Historic District is a  national historic district located on Reynolda Road in Winston-Salem, North Carolina. It includes work by Charles Barton Keen and by landscape architect Thomas Warren Sears.  The listing includes twenty-two contributing buildings and one other contributing structure.  It includes Reynolda House, Reynolda Gardens, Reynolda Village, and Reynolda Presbyterian Church. The district was once part of a larger, self-sufficient country estate conceived and developed by R. J. Reynolds, founder of the R. J. Reynolds Tobacco Company.

It was listed on the National Register of Historic Places in 1980.

Gallery

References

Historic districts on the National Register of Historic Places in North Carolina
Geography of Winston-Salem, North Carolina
National Register of Historic Places in Winston-Salem, North Carolina